Aeroflot Flight 1492 was a scheduled domestic passenger flight operated by Aeroflot from Moscow–Sheremetyevo to Murmansk, Russia. On 5 May 2019, the Sukhoi Superjet 100 aircraft operating the flight was climbing out when it was struck by lightning. The aircraft suffered an electrical failure and returned to Sheremetyevo for an emergency landing. It bounced on landing and touched down hard, causing the landing gear to collapse, fuel to spill out of the wings, and a fire to erupt. The fire engulfed the rear of the aircraft, killing 41 of the 78 occupants.

Aircraft
The aircraft was a Russian-built Sukhoi Superjet 100, MSN (manufacturer's serial number) 95135, and was registered as RA-89098. It was delivered new to Aeroflot on 27 September 2017 and had accumulated 2,710 flight hours and 1,658 cycles (a flight cycle consists of a take-off and a landing) before the accident. Aeroflot Superjets are configured with 87 passenger seats, 12 in business and 75 in economy.

Accident
Flight 1492 took off from runway 24C at Sheremetyevo International Airport, bound for Murmansk Airport, on 5 May 2019 at 18:03 local time (15:03 UTC). When the plane was approaching the thunderstorm zone, a 327 degree heading was selected manually at 18:07 local time (15:07 UTC), initiating a right turn earlier than it is prescribed by the КN 24Е standard instrument departure, but the crew did not request active thunderstorm area avoidance clearance. At 15:08 UTC, the aircraft was climbing through flight level 89 (around ) when it was struck by lightning. The primary radio and autopilot became inoperative and the flight control mode changed to DIRECT – a degraded, more challenging mode of operation. The captain assumed manual control of the aircraft. The transponder code was changed to 7600 (to indicate radio failure) at 15:09 UTC and subsequently to 7700 (emergency) at 15:26 UTC while on final approach. The secondary radio (VHF2) remained operative and the crew were able to restore communication with air traffic control (ATC) and made a pan-pan call on the emergency frequency.

The aircraft stopped its climb at flight level 106 (around ) and was guided towards Sheremetyevo by ATC. It performed a right orbit before lining up for approach to runway 24L; the crew tuned into the instrument landing system and the captain flew the approach manually. At 15:18:53 UTC, the captain attempted to contact the controller to request a holding area, but his message was not recorded by the controller's recorder. The flaps were lowered to 25 degrees, which is the recommended setting for an overweight landing in DIRECT mode. Between  and  AGL, the predictive windshear warning sounded repeatedly: "GO-AROUND, WINDSHEAR AHEAD". The crew did not acknowledge this warning on tape. Descending through , the aircraft began to deviate below the glideslope and the "GLIDESLOPE" aural alert sounded. As he reduced the thrust to idle for the flare, the captain made several large, alternating sidestick inputs, causing the pitch to vary between +6 and −2 degrees.

Concurrently with the touchdown, in the span of 0.4 seconds, the sidestick was moved from full aft to full forward. Though the spoilers were armed, automatic spoiler deployment is inhibited in DIRECT mode and they were not extended manually. The captain attempted to apply maximum reverse thrust while he continued to hold the sidestick in the fully forward position. Reverse thrust and reverser door deployment is inhibited in the absence of weight on the aircraft's wheels (i.e. in flight) and the reverser doors only began to open upon the second touchdown. The aircraft lifted off the ground before the reverse door cycle was completed and reverse thrust did not activate. The main landing gear weak links sheared – the weak links are designed to shear under heavy load to minimise damage to the wing – allowing the gear legs to "move up and backwards" and the wing remained intact. The thrust levers were advanced to take-off power – the reverser doors began to close – and the sidestick was pulled full aft in a possible attempt to go around. The landing gear collapsed, penetrating the wing, and fuel spilled out of the wing tanks. A fire erupted, engulfing the wings, rear fuselage and empennage. Fire alarms sounded in the cockpit for the aft cargo hold and the auxiliary power unit. The aircraft slid down the runway, veered to the left and came to a standstill on the grass between two runway-adjoining taxiways with the nose facing upwind at 15:30 UTC. Power to the engines was cut at 15:31 UTC. Flight recorder data suggest that control over the engines had been lost after the final impact.

An evacuation was carried out from the front passenger doors and their slides were deployed. The first officer used the escape rope to climb out of the right cockpit window. Aeroflot claimed the evacuation took 55 seconds, though video evidence shows the slides still in use 70 seconds after their deployment. Passengers were seen carrying hand luggage out of the aircraft. The rear half of the aircraft was destroyed by the fire, which was extinguished about 45 minutes after landing.

Passengers and crew
Five crew and seventy-three passengers were onboard on the aircraft. The crew consisted of the captain, a first officer, and three cabin crew members. The captain, 42-year-old Denis Yevdokimov, held an airline transport pilot licence and had 6,844 flying hours, including 1,570 on the Superjet. He had previously operated the Ilyushin Il-76 and a number of smaller aircraft for the FSB (2,320 flying hours) and the Boeing 737 for Transaero (2,022 flying hours). He was employed by Aeroflot and had made the transition onto the SSJ-100 in 2016. The 36-year-old first officer Maksim Kuznetsov joined Aeroflot in 2017, held a commercial pilot licence and had 773 hours of flying experience, including 623 on the Superjet.

Forty passengers and the flight attendant (21-year-old Maksim Moiseev) seated in the rear of the aircraft were killed. Forty of the fatalities were Russian and one a US citizen, and twenty-six resided in Murmansk Oblast, including a 12-year-old girl. One crew member and two passengers sustained serious injuries, and three crew members and four passengers minor injuries. The remaining 27 passengers were unharmed.

Investigation

The Interstate Aviation Committee (IAC) opened an investigation into the accident. The French BEA participated as a representative of the state of design of the aircraft engine and EASA offered technical advice to BEA. Both flight recorders were recovered. The cockpit voice recorder (CVR) was found in satisfactory condition, but the flight data recorder (FDR) casing was damaged by exposure to extremely high temperatures, and data recovery depended on IAC specialists.

Data reading was completed on 17 May 2019, permitting analysis to begin. The IAC sent a follow-up accident report to Rosaviatsiya, the Russian civil aviation authority. Rosaviatsiya issued a safety information bulletin containing a summary of the accident and a number of recommendations.

On 30 May, TASS reported IAC expert Vladimir Kofman was attending the Transport Security Forum where he said that "the disaster occurred because of [the] hard touchdowns". His comment evoked a sharp response from Aeroflot and the IAC issued a six-point press release distancing itself from Kofman. The IAC said they would be conducting an internal investigation and that Kofman was not part of the Flight 1492 investigation. The IAC asked news media to provide video or audio evidence of "published statements made by Kofman". The IAC said they continued to analyse data from the accident and that they were preparing for the 5 June release of the preliminary report, concluding, "in this regard, neither IAC nor other persons currently can not have  reliable information about the establishment by the Investigation team of the causes of the fatal accident".

Interim report
On 14 June 2019, the IAC published their interim report, presenting a detailed reconstruction of the accident, but they did not draw any conclusions. The pilots did not request active storm avoidance from air traffic control. However, they entered the second segment of the departure, initiating a right turn away from the storm earlier than prescribed. The crew omitted to perform the approach briefing and the approach checklist, and did not set the go-around altitude. During landing, sidestick inputs were "of an abrupt and intermittent character", including wide-amplitude, sweeping pitch movements not observed during approaches in normal flight law, but similar to other Aeroflot pilots' direct flight law approaches. The report also noted that the pilots ignored a windshear warning that would have required a go-around unless it was spurious. Investigators found traces of lightning impact on antennae, various sensors, exit lights and the cockpit windows. Investigators re-examined the design of the landing gear and found that it met certification requirements. The report cited a material provided by Sukhoi claiming that contemporary certification requirements did not consider the effect of "secondary impacts of the airframe on the ground after the destruction of the landing gear". The interim report did not look into the survival factors of the accident, citing that they were still being analyzed and would be included in the final report.

In May 2022, in a status update marking the third anniversary of the accident, the IAC noted that it expected to issue the draft final report shortly. Multiple aircraft systems have been investigated; some decrypted data from the Curtiss-Wright fire protection units is not available to the investigators due to intellectual property issues.

Criminal proceedings
A criminal investigation was opened into a fatal "violation of the rules of safe movement and exploitation of air transport". The Investigative Committee said on 6 May it was considering insufficient skill of the pilots, dispatchers and those who performed the technical inspection of the plane, along with mechanical problems and poor weather, as a possible cause of the accident. A high-ranking law enforcement source told Lenta.ru that experts would examine the actions of Sheremetyevo's fire and rescue service. The source said air traffic control were late with raising the alarm and fire engines had not left the fire station at the time of the accident. Only two of the six available engines were involved within the first six minutes and they were not filled with foam, which is more effective against a fuel-fed fire than water.

Investigators filed charges against the captain in October 2019, seeking a seven-year prison term. According to a spokeswoman for the Russian Investigative Committee, his actions "violated the existing regulations and led to the destruction and outbreak of fire".

Aftermath

Evacuation with luggage
There was widespread speculation that the evacuation was delayed by passengers retrieving hand luggage, prompted by video footage showing passengers leaving the plane with luggage in hand. According to TASS, citing a law enforcement source, the majority of passengers in the tail end of the aircraft had practically no chance of rescue; many of them did not have time to unfasten their seat belts. He added that those passengers from the tail section of the aircraft who managed to escape had moved to the front of the aircraft before it stopped, and that he had no confirmation that retrieval of luggage had slowed the evacuation. Speculation that the observed retrieval of luggage caused an evacuation delay was rejected by one anonymous witness.

Response from Aeroflot
On 6 May 2019, Aeroflot announced that it would compensate surviving passengers and the families of the dead. Passengers who did not require hospitalization were to receive 1,000,000 rubles (US$15,320), passengers who were hospitalized were to receive 2,000,000 rubles ($30,640), and the families of the dead were to receive 5,000,000 rubles ($76,600).

Following the release of the accident summary by Rosaviatsiya on 17 May, it was reported in the media that the pilots had failed to set some of the surfaces of the wing – variously referred to as the "flaps", "brakes" and "air brakes" in news reports – for landing. On the same day, Aeroflot issued a statement in which it denied the pilots had violated company procedures. Aeroflot said the flaps were properly configured for landing and that the spoilers should be extended manually only when reverse thrust is applied and the aircraft has settled on the runway. The airline said preliminary information by Rosaviatsiya is not evidence of pilot error and criticised the media for jumping to conclusions.

Cancellations and public perception
On 5 May 2019, a petition to ground the Sukhoi Superjet 100 (SSJ100) during the investigation was launched on Change.org. On 8 May, it had collected over 140,000 signatures and, when asked, Kremlin Press Secretary Dmitry Peskov said the decision should be taken by the competent aviation authorities and not by citizens who sign petitions on the Change.org portal. The Ministry of Transport of Russia decided against grounding the SSJ100, stating there was no obvious sign of a design flaw.

Aeroflot cancelled approximately 50 SSJ100 flights in the week after the accident. Kommersant cited industry sources as saying the SSJ100 had lower dispatch reliability than Airbus and Boeing aircraft in the airline's fleet historically and attributed a rise in cancellations to "increased safety measures" at Aeroflot while the accident is investigated. The SSJ100 suffered a number of technical failures in the weeks following the accident which attracted media attention in Russia. On 18 May 2019, an Aeroflot SSJ100 from Ulyanovsk to Moscow–Sheremetyevo aborted its take-off due to a hydraulics failure indication following which the passengers refused to fly on the Superjet.

On 17 May 2019, it was reported that Russian regional airline RusLine abandoned its plans to operate 18 SSJ100s. According to the owner, this is because of the "likely reputational [sic] risks" associated with the accident. On 22 May, the Russian airline Alrosa retired its Tupolev Tu-134 fleet, announcing that it was not abandoning plans to replace the Tu-134 with up to three SSJ100 by 2021 "despite all the hysteria".

On 24 May 2019, the Russian Association of Air Transport Operators (AEVT) requested a review of the SSJ100 for compliance with certification requirements in a letter sent to Minister of Transport Yevgeny Dietrich. The AEVT questioned whether electrical supply should have been disrupted by the lightning strike and whether the fuel system should have been compromised by impact forces. The letter said the flight control system, engines, cabin protection from an external fire and the crew training programme should all be examined for compliance. United Aircraft Corporation, the manufacturer of the Superjet, said the AEVT appeared to apply pressure on the technical investigation. As of 28 May, AEVT members operated 19 SSJ100s. Aeroflot, the operator of the accident aircraft, is not a member of the AEVT.

See also

 2012 Mount Salak Sukhoi Superjet crash
 2019 in aviation
 2019 in Russia
 Aeroflot accidents and incidents
 LANSA Flight 508 – 1971 accident after the aircraft suffered a lightning strike
 List of accidents and incidents involving airliners by location#Russia
 List of accidents and incidents involving commercial aircraft
 Pan Am Flight 214 – 1963 accident after the aircraft suffered a lightning strike

References

External links

RRJ-95B RA-89098 05.05.2019 - Interstate Aviation Committee - Russian version
Aeroflot news releases
Passenger list and survivor list
Aeroflot confirms engine fire on flight SU1492 Moscow–Murmansk 5 May 2019
Flightradar24 data regarding Aeroflot flight 1492

Cockpit Voice Recorder transcript
Safety information bulletin from Rosaviatsiya, containing a summary of the accident
Interim Report from the Interstate Aviation Committee, 92 pages

2019 fires in Europe
2019 in Moscow
Accidents and incidents involving the Sukhoi Superjet 100
1492
Aircraft fires
Aviation accidents and incidents in 2019
Aviation accidents and incidents in Russia
2019 disasters in Russia
Fires in Moscow
May 2019 events in Russia